"When the Going Gets Tough, the Tough Get Going" is a 1985 song co-written and originally recorded by English singer Billy Ocean in 1985.

Description
Written by Wayne Brathwaite, Barry Eastmond, Mutt Lange and Ocean, the song was used as the theme song for the Michael Douglas and Kathleen Turner film The Jewel of the Nile (1985), a sequel to Romancing the Stone (1984). The saxophone solo is by Vernon Jeffrey Smith.

The song became a major international success, reaching number one on the UK Singles Chart for four weeks in February 1986, and number two on the Billboard Hot 100, stalling behind "How Will I Know" by Whitney Houston. It remains his only number-one single in the UK to date.

Music video
A music video was shot at Brixton Academy in London, and features Douglas and his Jewel of the Nile co-stars Kathleen Turner and Danny DeVito as lip-synching backing vocalists. It reportedly boosted the popularity of the venue.

The video was initially banned on Top of the Pops because the actors were not part of the Musicians' Union, meaning DeVito's miming of the saxophone solo went against the rules.

Track listing
12-inch single
 A1 "When the Going Gets Tough, the Tough Get Going" (Extended Version) – 5:43
 A2 "When the Going Gets Tough, the Tough Get Going" (7″ Version) – 4:08
 B1 "When the Going Gets Tough, the Tough Get Going" (Club Mix) – 7:35
 B2 "When the Going Gets Tough, the Tough Get Going" (Instrumental) – 5:12

Other versions
 7th Heaven Club Mix – 6:44
 7th Heaven Radio Edit – 4:22

Charts

Weekly charts

Year-end charts

Certifications

Boyzone version

Irish boy band Boyzone recorded a cover version for the 1999 Comic Relief telethon, shortening the title to "When the Going Gets Tough". Like the original, their version also reached number one on the UK Singles Chart, becoming their fifth chart-topper. It spent two weeks at number one. The song received a platinum certification in the UK. The video included Graham Norton, Jo Brand, Phill Jupitus, Mel Smith, Davina McCall, Harry Hill, Steve Collins, John McCririck, Jimmy White, Mystic Meg, Will Mellor, James Dreyfus, the cast of Emmerdale, Adam Buxton and Joe Cornish, and Ulrika Jonsson and Saracen from Gladiators.

Track listings
UK CD single
 "When the Going Gets Tough"
 "What a Wonderful World" (performed by Alison Moyet)
 "Love Can Build a Bridge" (documentary track—performed by Cher, Chrissie Hynde and Neneh Cherry)

UK cassette single
 "When the Going Gets Tough"
 "What a Wonderful World" (performed by Alison Moyet)

French CD single
 "When the Going Gets Tough" – 3:35
 "I'll Never Not Need You" – 4:07

Personnel
Personnel are lifted from the By Request album booklet.

Main personnel

 Wayne Brathwaite – writing
 Barry Eastmond – writing
 Robert John Lange – writing
 Billy Ocean – writing
 Wayne Hector – additional backing vocals
 Andy Caine – additional backing vocals

 Tracy Ackerman – additional backing vocals
 Paul Gendler – guitars
 Steve Mac – production, mixing
 Chris Laws – engineering, programming
 Matt Howe – mix engineering

Orchestra

 Guy Barker – trumpet
 Phil Todd – saxophone
 Ann Morfee – violin
 Ian Humphries – violin
 Rebecca Hirsch – violin
 Nicolette Humphries – violin
 Helen Paterson – violin
 Richard George – violin
 Clare Thompson – violin
 Anna Hemery – violin
 Laura Melhuish – violin
 Steve Morris – violin

 Deborah Widdup – violin
 Gillian Kent – violin
 Clare Finnimore – viola
 Bruce White – viola
 Paul Martin – viola
 Sue Dench – viola
 Nick Cooper – cello
 Jonathan Tunnell – cello
 Audrey Riley – cello
 Emma Black – cello
 Richard Niles – string and brass arrangement
 Graeme Perkins – orchestra contractor

Charts

Weekly charts

Year-end charts

Certifications

References

External links
 

1985 songs
1985 singles
1986 singles
1996 singles
1999 singles
Billy Ocean songs
Boyzone songs
Cashbox number-one singles
Comic Relief singles
Dutch Top 40 number-one singles
European Hot 100 Singles number-one singles
Irish Singles Chart number-one singles
Jive Records singles
Number-one singles in Australia
Number-one singles in Belgium
Number-one singles in Denmark
Number-one singles in Norway
Number-one singles in Scotland
Polydor Records singles
RPM Top Singles number-one singles
Song recordings produced by Robert John "Mutt" Lange
Song recordings produced by Steve Mac
Songs written by Barry Eastmond
Songs written by Billy Ocean
Songs written by Robert John "Mutt" Lange
Songs written by Wayne Brathwaite
UK Singles Chart number-one singles